James Tomkinson  (1840 – 10 April 1910) was an English landowner and Liberal politician.

Life

Born in 1840, Tomkinson lived at Willington Hall, Chester. He was the son of Waterloo veteran Lieutenant-Colonel William Tomkinson and Susan, daughter of Thomas Tarleton of Bolesworth Castle, Cheshire and a descendent of Sir Roland Egerton, 1st Baronet.

He was High Sheriff of Cheshire in 1887. In 1895, he unsuccessfully contested Nuneaton for the Liberals, but at the 1900 general election he was elected as Member of Parliament (MP) for Crewe, holding the seat until his death in April 1910. He was appointed a deputy lieutenant of Cheshire in 1901, became Second Church Estates Commissioner in 1907, and member of the Privy Council in November 1909.

In 1871 Tomkinson married Emily Frances Palmer, a daughter of Sir George Palmer, 3rd Baronet, by his marriage to Emily Elizabeth Holford.

Tomkinson died on 10 April 1910 from injuries sustained in a fall while participating in the House of Commons Steeplechase.

Descendants
Charles William Tomkinson (1877–1939)
James Edward Tomkinson, later Palmer-Tomkinson (1879–1961)
James Algernon Palmer-Tomkinson (1915–1952)
Charles Palmer-Tomkinson (born 1940)
James Palmer-Tomkinson
Santa Palmer-Tomkinson, now Santa Montefiore (born 1970)
Tara Palmer-Tomkinson (1971–2017)
Christopher Palmer-Tomkinson (born 1942)
Jeremy Palmer-Tomkinson (born 1943)
Jane Lindsay Tomkinson, who in 1935 married Herbert Ingram, later Sir Herbert Ingram (1912–1980)
Henry Archdale Tomkinson (1881–1937) (Brigadier Tomkinson), manager of the royal Racing and Breeding Studs

References

External links 
 

1840 births
1910 deaths
British people of English descent
People from Chester
Deputy Lieutenants of Cheshire
High Sheriffs of Cheshire
Members of the Privy Council of the United Kingdom
Liberal Party (UK) MPs for English constituencies
UK MPs 1900–1906
UK MPs 1906–1910
UK MPs 1910
English landowners
James
19th-century British businesspeople
Church Estates Commissioners